The Cathedral Basilica of Our Lady of Peace , also called La Paz Cathedral, is a cathedral and minor basilica is located in Murillo Square in the city of La Paz in Bolivia. It was built in 1835 with a neoclassical architecture with Baroque elements. It has an interior consisting of five naves  with different layers.

The first cathedral of La Paz was completed in 1692 after 70 years of construction; the first building was made of stone, lime and brick. In 1831 it was decided to demolish it due to the collapse of its presbytery and several cracks that threatened its collapse. The construction of the current cathedral began on March 24, 1835; it was inaugurated in 1925, marking the first centenary of the founding of the Republic of Bolivia. Although it opened that year, its interior ornamentation still continued until 1932.

In 1989, its two lateral towers were opened, this event coinciding with the visit of Pope John Paul II.

See also
Roman Catholicism in Bolivia
Cathedral Basilica of Our Lady of Peace

References

Roman Catholic cathedrals in Bolivia
Buildings and structures in La Paz
Roman Catholic churches completed in 1925
Basilica churches in Bolivia
20th-century Roman Catholic church buildings